National Yang-Ming University (NYMU) was a research university located in Shipai, Beitou District, Taipei, Taiwan. It was known for research in the fields of Medicine, Life Sciences and Biotechnology. In the 2010 QS Asian Universities Rankings, Yang Ming University was placed 4th among universities in Taiwan and 2nd in the field of Life Science & Biomedicine. NYMU was one of the seven national research universities.

Yang-Ming was named after the Chinese philosopher Wang Yangming. It was merged with National Chiao Tung University into the newly formed National Yang Ming Chiao Tung University on 1 February 2021.

History 
The university was founded in 1975 as the National Yang-Ming College of Medicine to cultivate first-class medical professionals and biomedical scientists. In 1994, it was granted university status to National Yang-Ming University by the Ministry of Education and became the first university in Taiwan dedicated to biomedical education and research. Along with its original mission, the university was devoted to excelling in biomedical research, and to promoting intercollegiate and international collaboration.

In the 30 years since its founding, NYMU enjoyed a robust growth. By the end of the 2005 academic year, NYMU became a medium-sized university with 5 schools - Medicine, Dentistry, Medical Technology and Biomedical Engineering, Life Sciences and Nursing, and a Center for General Education. Additionally, the Taipei Veterans General Hospital, served as the teaching hospital for medical and paramedical students. NYMU also established 15 research centers with a wide spectrum of emphases including Genomic Medicine, Brain Research, Cognitive Neuroscience, Immunology, Cellular and Molecular Biology, Biomedical Engineering, Medical Imaging, Biophotonics, Bioinformatics, Health Informatics, AIDS, Community Medicine, and Community Nursing.

President Liang Kung-Yee(:zh:梁赓义) was awarded the Rema Lapouse Award in 2010.

As of 2019 the President of NYMU was Steve Kuo and the vice president was William Stanton.

Negotiations on a merger between National Yang-Ming University and National Chiao Tung University began in December 2018. Both educational institutions voted to proceed with the merger in September 2019, which was approved by the Ministry of Education in June 2020.

Organization

The university had 7 departments and 28 graduate institutes, which are organized into 6 schools: Biomedical Science and Engineering, Dentistry, Humanities and Social Sciences, Life Sciences, Medicine, and Nursing. In 2007, NYMU enrolled 1,836 undergraduate students and 2,297 graduate students.

International programs
NYMU participated in the Molecular Medicine Program and the Bioinformatics Program of the Taiwan International Graduate Program of Academia Sinica, Taiwan's most preeminent academic research institution.

Ranking

Partners health care system
In cooperation with Taipei City Hospital System and National Chengchi University, the three institution formed a health care system which covers medical education, healthcare, and management.

Notable alumni
 Shiu Ming-neng, Vice Minister of Health and Welfare (2013–2016)

See also
List of universities in Taiwan
Education in Taiwan

References

External links 

 

 
Educational institutions disestablished in 2021
Educational institutions established in 1975